Isabela Maria Onyshko (born 23 June 1998 in Minnedosa) is a Canadian artistic gymnast who represented her country at the 2016 Summer Olympics, the 2014 Commonwealth Games, as well as the 2014, 2015 and 2017 World Championships. She was the 2014 National Champion on beam. In 2016, she won Elite Canada and the National Championships in the individual All Around.

Senior career

2014 
At the 2014 Commonwealth Games, Onyshko finished fourth with her team and seventh in the all-around. Also in 2014, she competed at the 2014 World Artistic Gymnastics Championships in Nanning, China. Her team placed 12th in qualifications, failing to qualify to the team final, but they did qualify a full team for the 2015 World Championships.

2015 
In January 2015, Onyshko competed at the Elite Canada competition, placing second overall, with third places finishes on the beam and the floor. At the Artistic Gymnastics World Cup event in Ljubljana Onyshko won three medals winning her first world cup gold in the uneven bars and another win on the balance beam while placing second in the floor event.
In September, Gymnastics Canada named Onyshko to their World Championships team. She will represent Canada at the 2015 World Artistic Gymnastics Championships alongside 6 of her teammates from October 23 to November 1, 2015.

2016 
On February 5, 2016, Onyshko won the 2016 Elite Canada competition. Later that month, she won all-around silver at the Stuttgart World Cup. She went on to compete at the Olympic Test Event in Rio de Janeiro, placing fourth on balance beam and floor exercise; and tenth in the all-around.

In June, she competed at the Canadian National Championships, besting reigning champion Ellie Black to win the all-around. She additionally won gold on uneven bars and balance beam, bronze on floor exercise, and placed fourth on vault. She then represented Canada at the 2016 Summer Olympics, where the team finished ninth. Individually, Onyshko finished 18th all around and 8th on beam. She became the first Canadian gymnast to make a beam final at the Olympics.

Competitive History

References

External links 

 
 Isabela Onyshko at Gymnastics Canada

1998 births
Canadian female artistic gymnasts
Living people
People from Minnedosa, Manitoba
Sportspeople from Manitoba
Pan American Games silver medalists for Canada
Gymnasts at the 2016 Summer Olympics
Olympic gymnasts of Canada
Canadian people of Ukrainian descent
Pan American Games medalists in gymnastics
Gymnasts at the 2018 Commonwealth Games
Commonwealth Games medallists in gymnastics
Commonwealth Games gold medallists for Canada
Gymnasts at the 2015 Pan American Games
Gymnasts at the 2019 Pan American Games
Medalists at the 2015 Pan American Games
Medalists at the 2019 Pan American Games
20th-century Canadian women
21st-century Canadian women
Medallists at the 2018 Commonwealth Games